Ole Tinghaug (born 6 December 1945) is a Norwegian politician for the Progress Party.

He served as a deputy representative to the Parliament of Norway from Aust-Agder during the terms 1989–1993 and 1997–2001. In total he met during 14 days of parliamentary session.

References

1945 births
Living people
Progress Party (Norway) politicians
Deputy members of the Storting
Aust-Agder politicians
Place of birth missing (living people)
20th-century Norwegian politicians